Toshio Suzuki may refer to:

, Japanese film producer
, Japanese racing driver